Zell is an unincorporated community located in Ste. Genevieve Township in Ste. Genevieve County, Missouri, United States. Zell is located approximately six miles west of Sainte Genevieve.

Name 

Zell is named for the town of Zell am Harmersbach in the Baden region of the German state of Baden-Württemberg, located about 10 miles southeast of Offenburg, from where its settlers had originally come.

History 

What is now Zell was first settled in 1798 when 1,000 arpents of land (1 arpent = ) were granted to Pierre Charles Dehault Delassus Deluziere, which he called the Prairie Gautier Tract.  In 1819, following Delassus' death, this land was sold to his son Charles Dehault Delassus, and then shortly after to Charles’ nephew Felix de St. Vrain.

In 1837 German Catholics arrived, at which time the location was known as Nouvelle Alsace (French: New Alsace), and was subsequently renamed Zell in 1840. The Catholic church of St. Joseph was built between 1845-1847.

Geography

Zell is located in Ste. Genevieve Township. The site is just northeast of Interstate 55, along Missouri Route A.

Climate

The climate in this area is characterized by hot, humid summers and generally cld winters.  According to the Köppen Climate Classification system, Zell has a humid subtropical climate, abbreviated "Cfa" on climate maps.

References 

Unincorporated communities in Ste. Genevieve County, Missouri
Unincorporated communities in Missouri